Dastaan is a TV show that aired on Zee TV from 1995 to 1997. The show was shot in the U.A.E., particularly Sharjah, and starred Parmeet Sethi, Navni Parihar, Nishigandha Wad and Ashish Vidyarthi. It was directed by Farouk Masoudi, who would go on to direct another U.A.E. filmed Zee TV Series - Chattaan.
Dastaan was about the rivalry between two businessmen — Karan Kapoor and Lankesh.  The Show also features Suresh Oberoi as Rohan, Karan's best Friend and temporary chairman of Karan's company. Prominent Sharjah landmarks of the 90s featured in this show include Souq Al Majarrah, Jazeera Park, Ittihad Park, Bait Al Naboodah, Souq Al Arsah and many more. Incomplete sequence of this series' episodes are available on YouTube, uploaded by Zee TV's official account.

Cast 
Parmeet Sethi as Karan Kapoor
Ashish Vidyarthi as Lankesh
Navni Parihar as Suman
Nishgandha Wad as Nishi Malhotra
Mahavir Shah as Raj Tilak
Neelima Parandekar as Mona
Supriya Karnik as Roma
Kamal Nandi as Mukherjee
Nasir Ali as Tiwari
Sohail Butt as Sohail
Narendra Sadhwani as Hasmukh
Imran Khan as Kapil Mehra
Afshan Khan as Sonia Kapoor
Virendra Saxena as Vasudev
Anwar Mehfooz as Car Showroom Manager
Suresh Oberoi as Rohan
Khalid Bin Shaheen as Varun Wadi
Navneet Nishan as Neelam
Shalini Kapoor as Shalini
Timmy Abdullah as Saleem
Sadhana as Mrs. Sharma
Wafa Haji as Anjali
Niki Aneja Walia

References

External links 
Dastaan title song on YouTube
Dastaan Zee TV Episodes and Clips Playlist on YouTube
Dastaan photo gallery on IMDb

Zee TV original programming
1995 Indian television series debuts
1996 Indian television series endings
Indian drama television series
Dubai in fiction